Varshini Prakash (born 1992/1993) is an American climate activist and executive director of the Sunrise Movement, a  501(c)(4) organization which she co-founded in 2017. She was named on the 2019 Time 100 Next list, and was a corecipient of the Sierra Club John Muir Award in 2019.

Early life and education 
Prakash was born and raised in Massachusetts to parents from Southern India; her father was from Tamil Nadu. She first became aware of climate change when she was 11 while watching news coverage of the 2004 Indian Ocean tsunami which impacted Chennai, where her grandparents lived.  Growing up, she wanted to become a doctor.

Prakash went to college at the University of Massachusetts Amherst where she began organizing around climate issues.  In late 2015, devastating floods in South India seized her attention, having caused flooding up to the level of her grandparents' apartment in Chennai.  To help combat climate change, Prakash became a leader of the school's fossil fuel divestment campaign. Prakash also worked with a national organization, Fossil Fuel Divestment Student Network. In 2016, a year after she graduated, UMass Amherst became the first large, public university to divest.

Career 
In 2017, Prakash launched the Sunrise Movement, an American youth-led political movement and 501(c)(4) that advocates political action on climate change, with seven other co-founders.

In 2018, she became the Sunrise Movement's executive director after the group organized a protest occupying U.S. House Speaker Nancy Pelosi's office asking that a congressional task force be established to address climate change.

As part of her work with the Sunrise Movement, Prakash advocates for proposals like the Green New Deal. In 2020, the organization endorsed U.S. senator Bernie Sanders in the Democratic Primary for the presidency. Prakash was named as an adviser to Joe Biden’s climate task force in 2020. She is also an advisory board member of Climate Power 2020, a group that includes Democrats and activists advocating for increasing the interest American voters take in climate action.

Prakash is co-editor of the book Winning the Green New Deal: Why We Must, How We Can, released August 2020. She also is a contributor to The New Possible: Visions of Our World Beyond Crisis. Prakash appeared in Rachel Lears' 2022 documentary film, To the End, which focuses on the effects of climate change. The film debuted at the 2022 Sundance Film Festival and was presented at the Tribeca Film Festival in June 2022.

Recognition 
Prakash was named on the 2019 Time 100 Next list of emerging global leaders.  She was a finalist for the 2019 Pritzker Emerging Environmental Genius Award from the University of California, Los Angeles.  She received Dickinson College's Rose-Walters Prize for Environmental Activism with a college residency in the 2021–2022 academic year.

References

External links 

 Interview in the "How I Built This" podcast
Profile by Forbes

Living people
Year of birth missing (living people)
American climate activists
American people of Indian descent
American people of Indian Tamil descent
American environmentalists
Sierra Club awardees
University of Massachusetts Amherst people